Dowling Street Tram Depot was part of the Sydney tram network. It was the largest tram depot in Australia.

History
Dowling Street Tram Depot opened on 25 January 1909. The 27 road shed provided trams on the Coogee, La Perouse, Clovelly, Maroubra, Alexandria, Rosebery and Botany routes. It closed on 25 February 1961. After closure, the site was leased to Brambles before being redeveloped as the Supa Centa Moore Park shopping centre.

Design
It was the largest tram depot in Australia with twenty-seven roads. Design included:

27 tracks
Plain front parapet
Step gabled side walls
Roof orientation to south

References

Industrial buildings in Sydney
Tram depots in Sydney
Transport infrastructure completed in 1909
Demolished buildings and structures in Sydney